Towamensing Trails is a census-designated place (CDP) in Penn Forest Township, Carbon County, Pennsylvania, United States. It is part of Northeastern Pennsylvania.

The community is located directly south of the village of Albrightsville in the southern part of the Poconos, bordered by Pennsylvania Route 903 on the northwest, separating it from Albrightsville, and by Pennsylvania Route 534 on the northeast. PA 903 leads southwest  to Jim Thorpe, the Carbon County seat, and north  to Interstate 80 near Blakeslee, while PA 534 leads south  to U.S. Route 209 and west through Hickory Run State Park  to White Haven.

References

Census-designated places in Carbon County, Pennsylvania
Census-designated places in Pennsylvania